Alois Linka (24 April 1899 – 18 January 1968) was a Czech sprinter. He competed for Czechoslovakia in the men's 100 metres and the 200 metres events at the 1924 Summer Olympics.

References

External links
 
 

1899 births
1968 deaths
Athletes (track and field) at the 1924 Summer Olympics
Czech male sprinters
Olympic athletes of Czechoslovakia
People from Jičín
Sportspeople from the Hradec Králové Region